The Anna Russell Cole Auditorium is a historic building on the campus of Nashville School of the Arts in Nashville, Tennessee, U.S. It was built in 1894. It was named in honor of the wife of Confederate Colonel Edmund William Cole, who founded the Randall Cole Industrial School in 1885. It has been listed on the National Register of Historic Places since April 17, 1980. The building is not used or maintained.

References

Event venues on the National Register of Historic Places in Tennessee
Buildings and structures completed in 1894
Buildings and structures in Nashville, Tennessee